Meerut Lok Sabha constituency is one of the 80 Lok Sabha (parliamentary) constituencies in the Indian state of Uttar Pradesh. This constituency covers parts of Meerut and Hapur districts.

Assembly segments
Presently, Meerut Lok Sabha constituency comprises 5 Vidhan Sabha (legislative assembly) segments. In 2019, BJP won 3 and samajwadi party won 2.

Members of Parliament

Election results

General election 2019

General election 2014

General election 2009
Percentage changes are based on numbers from the 2004 elections.

General election 2004

See also
 Meerut district
 List of constituencies of the Lok Sabha

References

Politics of Meerut district
Lok Sabha constituencies in Uttar Pradesh